Mangalapally Srinivas (born 26 December 1974) is an Indian former cricketer. He played nine first-class matches for Hyderabad between 2000 and 2002.

See also
 List of Hyderabad cricketers

References

External links
 

1974 births
Living people
Indian cricketers
Hyderabad cricketers
Cricketers from Hyderabad, India